Vanity/Nemesis is the fourth studio album by Swiss heavy metal band Celtic Frost, released on 11 April 1990 through Noise Records.

Modern reviews see this album as a return-to-form compared to the band's previous album, Cold Lake, but contemporary critics panned it. The band continued experimenting and evolving their music, this time fusing elements of traditional heavy metal, thrash metal and gothic rock. It has a different sound from the black/thrash metal of the first two albums, or the avant-garde metal of Into the Pandemonium, although Vanity/Nemesis retains lyrical and musical elements from those releases.

Vanity/Nemesis would be Celtic Frost's last studio album before the dissolution of the band in 1993 and until their return album in 2006 Monotheist. Vanity/Nemesis was re-released in 1999 with additional tracks. The album also includes a cover of David Bowie's 1977 hit "Heroes".

The track "The Heart Beneath" was used on the Manga Entertainment compilation trailers on the UK, Dutch, Spanish and Australian released video tapes.

Track listing

Personnel
Celtic Frost
Thomas Gabriel Warrior – lead vocals, rhythm guitars (except tracks 3, 7), bass (track 7), backing vocals (tracks 1, 2, 6, 7, 8)
Curt Victor Bryant – bass (except tracks 1, 7), lead and rhythm guitars (tracks 1, 2, 4, 5, 7, 8, 11, 12), backing vocals (tracks 1, 2)
Martin Eric Ain – bass (track 1), backing vocals (tracks 1, 7, 10)
Stephen Priestly – drums, backing vocals (track 2)

Additional musicians
Ron Marks – lead and rhythm guitars (except tracks 2, 7), acoustic guitars (track 10)
Michelle Fischer – additional vocals (track 1)
Roli Mosimann – additional vocals (track 1), sampling keyboards (track 10)
Michele Amar – additional vocals (tracks 3, 11)
Uta Gunther – backing vocals (tracks 3, 6, 9, 10, 12)

Production
Roli Mosimann – producer, additional arrangements
Brian Martin – engineer, mixing
Voco Fauxpas – engineer
Alex Leser, Michele Amar, Andreas Gerhardt, Michael Herzog, Tom Re – assistant engineers
Howie Weinberg – mastering at Masterdisk, New York
Karl-U. Walterbach – executive producer

References

Celtic Frost albums
1990 albums
Albums produced by Roli Mosimann
Noise Records albums